Rio Breaks is a 2009 American documentary film directed by Justin Mitchell, that explores surfing and slum-life in Rio de Janeiro through chronicling the trials and tribulations of two teenage surfers, Fabio and Naama, as they pursue the sport while also being tempted into the drug gang life of the favelas.

References

2009 documentary films
2009 films
Documentary films about surfing
Films set in Rio de Janeiro (city)
Films shot in Rio de Janeiro (city)
Surfing in Brazil
American surfing films
2000s American films